White Kitchen is an unincorporated community in St. Tammany Parish, Louisiana, United States. The West Pearl River flows past about one mile to the east and Pearlington, Mississippi is about five miles to the east.

Etymology
The name of the community is derived from a local restaurant that was built in 1931.

References

Unincorporated communities in St. Tammany Parish, Louisiana
Unincorporated communities in Louisiana
Unincorporated communities in New Orleans metropolitan area